Chirumhanzu District is a Second-order Administrative Sub-division of Midlands (Zimbabwe) between Gweru and Masvingo.

Its center is about 46 km south of Mvuma but the administrative centre has moved to Mvuma a small mining town that is found along Harare-Masvingo-Beitbridge Highway near Gweru Turn-off.

Geography

The district is 496 square kilometers in area. In 2002 census there were 70,441 people, thus 16,319 households and given a growth rate of 1.1% per annum, the current population is estimated
at +/- 80,000. (2016)

Chirumanzu communal lands occupy the southern part of Chirumanzu district between longitude 29˚50́E and 30˚45Έ and between latitudes 19˚30́S and 20˚20́S.

Weather

The mean annual rainfall is 650mm while the mean temperature ranges from 12-28˚C. 

Climate change
means that weather and
climate information
should now be
packaged timely and with greater relevance to specific areas, to help small-scale farmers plan
better.
For Chirumanzu District, click
|this | external link for an updated current and weekly weather forecast.

Background

Chirumhanzi District derives its name from the legendary Chirumhanzu chieftain. Chirumhanzu was a descriptive name for a particular chief. The correct spelling should be Chiri-muhanzu meaning "something that is hidden under the garment". The original Chief Chirimuhanzu had a celebrated garment made of dassie or rock-rabbit skins. 
He had special a pouch he kept under the garment skirts which many still think was a talisman or a stolen treasure. Local people, following their custom, did not dare to mention the chief's traditional name, and just said "Chirimuhanzu," meaning "that whatever in the garment". No one knew what dangled from underneath his garment, and they referred to that thing as "it in the garment" _ Chiri-mu-hanzu.

Local government

Chirumanzu Rural District Council now officially called Takawira Rural District Council is the local authority in this district. 
It operates in terms of the Zimbabwe Rural District Councils Act

Takawira RDC covers 2 parliamentary constituencies, Chirumhanzu constituency and Chirumanzu-Zibagwe constituency.

Economy

The chrome rich Great Dyke passes through the districts. There are a number of small mines along the Great Dyke which include |Netherburn Mine Latitude: -19°19'26.47" Longitude: 30°9'9.97" and Africa Chrome Fields

The bigger mines are Duration Gold, Athens Mine, Zimasco and Zim Alloys.

Hospitals

There are several mission hospitals in Chirumhanzu District; Driefontein, Holy Cross Mission, Muvonde Mission and St Theresa.

Education

Primary schools

Source: Chirumanzu Primary Schools

 Angley Ranch Primary School
 Batanai Primary School
 Chapwanya Primary School
 Chihosho Primary School
 Chilimanzi Primary School
 Chimbindi Primary School
 Chinyuni Primary School
 Chitendrano Primary School 
 Chitora Primary School
 Chiweshe Primary School
 Chizhou Primary School
 Chizvinire Primary School
 Debwe Primary School
 Driefontein Primary School 
 Fairfield Primary School
 Gwanza Primary School
 Govere Primary School
 Guramatunhu School
Mavhaire Primary school
 Machekano Tokwe Primary School
 Magada Primary School
 Majandu Primary School
 Makanya School
 Mapiravana Primary School
 Mashamba Primary School
 Maware Primary School
 Mazvimba School
 Muwani Primary School
 Gambiza Primary School
 Nyamandi Primary School
 Hwata Primary School
 Mhende Primary School
 Munikwa Primary School
 Mutya Primary School
 Nyautongwe Primary School
 Rupepwe Primary School
 Shashe Primary School
 st Josephs primary school

Secondary schools

Source: Chirumanzu Secondary Schools

ACEBS College 
 Chengwena Secondary School 
 Chizhou Secondary School
 Chivona Secondary School
 Gonawapotera School
 Lalapanzi Secondary School
 Mapiravana Secondary School 
 Mutenderende Secondary School
 Siyahokwe Government High School
 Holy Cross High School
 Hama Higher School
 Mushandirapamwe Secondary School
 Chamakanda Secondary School
 Chishuku Secondary School
 Driefontein Secondary School
 Leopold Takawira High School
 New England Secondary School
 Rambakombwa Secondary School
 Otton Drift Secondary School
Taringana secondary school
Mukomberanwa Secondary School

See also

 Takawira RDC 
 Midlands Province 
 Mvuma 
 Lalapanzi 
 Chirumanzu-Zibagwe constituency

References

Districts of Midlands Province